Geoff Thomas was an Australian tennis player who found success in the early 1900s.

He reached the semifinals of the 1913 Australasian Championships. In doubles, Thomas reached the semi-finals of the 1910 Australasian Championships (partnering V. Rudder).

External links
Geoff Thomas at Australian Open

Year of birth missing
Year of death missing
Australian male tennis players
Place of birth missing